Club Deportivo Heredia is a Guatemalan football team that last played in the Liga Nacional de Fútbol de Guatemala.

History
Founded as Deportivo Heredia in 1958, the club has been based in San Jose, Peten only since summer 2008. The team moved the club from Morales after low attendances and also changed the name to Heredia Jaguares de Peten after they only avoided relegation after appealing against Universidad's use of two suspended players in the first leg of a relegation playoff.

As of September 2011, Club Deportivo Heredia announced its exodus back to Morales, Izabal. Saying that "Morales is the original and native place of the club."

In the spring of 2013 Heredia qualified for the CONCACAF Champions League for the first time in the club's history.  On 21 August 2013 they made history again by winning 1–0 the first match of the CCL Group stage against the Canadian club Montreal Impact.  The match was played in neutral grounds at the Cementos Progreso stadium in Guatemala City.

The main sponsor is Fuente Del Norte Bus line.

Stadium
The club plays its home games at Estadio Del Monte in Bananera. The stadium, however, does not meet the standards of CONCACAF, therefore CONCACAF Champions League matches are played at the Estadio Cementos Progreso in Guatemala City.

Squads

First team

List of Coaches
 Francisco Melgar
 Eduardo Santana (2008)
 Sergio Pardo (2010–2011)
 Héctor Castellón (2012)
 Juan Carlos Elias (2013–)

Old logos

References

External links

 Official Website
Club logo

Football clubs in Guatemala
Association football clubs established in 1958
1958 establishments in Guatemala
Izabal Department
Petén Department